"All the King's Horses" is the fifteenth episode of the fifth and final series of the period drama Upstairs, Downstairs. It first aired on 14 December 1975 on ITV.

Background
All the King's Horses was recorded in the studio on 12 and 13 June 1975. The director of the episode, Simon Langton, was the son of David Langton, who played Richard Bellamy. All the King's Horses is the final appearance of Simon Williams as James Bellamy.

Cast
Simon Williams - James Bellamy
Gordon Jackson - Hudson
Hannah Gordon - Virginia Bellamy
David Langton - Richard Bellamy
Lesley-Anne Down - Georgina Worsley
Angela Baddeley - Mrs Bridges
Jean Marsh - Rose
Christopher Beeny - Edward
Pippa Page - Mary
Jacqueline Tong - Daisy
Lindsay Campbell - Inspector Rodwell

Plot
James Bellamy returns from America with renewed enthusiasm for life and hope for his future.  He has taken to speculating on the New York Stock Exchange and is making a lot of money. After bestowing lavish gifts on Virginia and Georgina, James proposes to pay for Georgina's wedding and even suggests moving to a bigger house as a direct result of his increasing wealth. He even manages to persuade Rose to invest her entire inheritance, from the estate of her deceased fiance Gregory, but sadly this is just before the Wall Street Crash of 1929. James loses everything, as does Rose.

The disclosure of the losses - particularly Rose's - leads to an argument with his father where James is berated for his failures. Richard tells James that he is glad his mother did not live to see the mess their son has created. Retreating to his room, James later upsets Georgina by burning the letters she wrote to him in happier times. He then leaves Eaton Place, ostensibly to visit a friend.  In reality he goes to a small hotel where he takes his own life with his service revolver.

Footnotes

References
Richard Marson, "Inside UpDown - The Story of Upstairs, Downstairs", Kaleidoscope Publishing, 2005
Updown.org.uk - Upstairs, Downstairs Fansite

Upstairs, Downstairs (series 5) episodes
1975 British television episodes
Fiction set in 1929